KCNQ1 downstream neighbour (KCNQ1DN) is a long non-coding RNA gene. In humans, it is located on chromosome 11p15.5 between the CDKN1C and KCNQ1 genes. It is an imprinted gene, expressed from the maternal allele. Reduced expression of KCNQ1DN is observed in Wilms' tumours.

See also
 Long noncoding RNA

References

Further reading

External links

Non-coding RNA